Coat of Arms is the twenty-third studio album by British rock band Wishbone Ash. It was released on 28 February 2020 by SPV GmbH on Steamhammer. It is also the final Wishbone Ash studio album to feature longtime drummer Joe Crabtree, who left the band in January 2022 to be replaced by Mike Truscott

Track listing

Charts

References

2020 albums
Wishbone Ash albums